Petroscirtes springeri is a species of combtooth blenny found in coral reefs in the northwest Pacific ocean.  This species reaches a length of  SL. The specific name honours the American ichthyologist Victor G. Springer of the United States National Museum, it was Springer who first introduced the author to the blenniids and who suggested the study in which Smith-Vaniz described this species.

References

springeri
Fish described in 1976